Charles Aaron "Bubba" Smith (February 28, 1945 – August 3, 2011) was an American football defensive end and actor. He first came into prominence at Michigan State University, where he twice earned All-American honors on the Spartans football team. Smith had a major role in a 10–10 tie with Notre Dame in 1966 that was billed as "The Game of the Century." He is one of only six players to have his jersey number retired by the program. He was inducted into the College Football Hall of Fame in 1988.

The first selection of the 1967 NFL/AFL draft, Smith played nine years in the National Football League (NFL) with the Baltimore Colts (1967–1971), Oakland Raiders (1973–1974), and Houston Oilers (1975–1976). He was the Colts' starting left defensive end for five seasons, playing in Super Bowls III and V. He was named to two Pro Bowls and was a First-team All-Pro in 1971.

During his acting career, Smith specialized in comedic roles in film, television, and television advertising. For about a decade following his retirement from football, he appeared in various commercials for Miller Lite. His best-known role was as Moses Hightower in the first six Police Academy movies.

Smith was posthumously diagnosed with CTE, a neurological condition generally related to concussion and sub-concussive head trauma.

Early life
Smith was born on February 28, 1945, in Orange, Texas, to Willie Ray Smith Sr. and Georgia Oreatha Curl Smith, and raised in nearby Beaumont. His father, Willie Ray Smith Sr., was a football coach who earned 235 victories at three high schools in the Beaumont area. Bubba had the opportunity to play for his father at Charlton-Pollard High School in Beaumont. He developed into one of the state's best-ever high school football players. Smith's younger brother Tody Smith played collegiately for the University of Southern California, and professionally for the Dallas Cowboys, Houston Oilers, and Buffalo Bills.

Football career

College
Smith originally had hopes of playing college football at the University of Texas. Even though Longhorns head coach Darrell Royal regarded him as worthy of an athletic scholarship, Royal was unwilling to offer one in the face of racial segregation which prevailed throughout the southern United States at the time. Texas was then a member of the Southwest Conference (SWC), which began to integrate in 1967. The university's football program lagged behind, before acquiescing in 1970.

The situation at UT motivated Smith to become a much better player at Michigan State University, where he was an All-American in both 1965 and 1966. He was a popular athlete at Michigan State, earning the arresting fan chant of "Kill, Bubba, Kill."

His final game at Michigan State was a 10–10 tie with Notre Dame at Spartan Stadium on November 19, 1966. With both teams undefeated, untied and ranked atop the national polls going in (The Fighting Irish were ranked #1 at 8–0–0, the Spartans #2 at 9–0–0), the match-up was hyped as the college "Game of the Century". Early in the first quarter, Smith tackled Notre Dame starting quarterback Terry Hanratty, who sustained a separated left shoulder. Hanratty was replaced for the remainder of the game by Coley O'Brien. Smith, who admitted that Hanratty's injury actually backfired on the Spartans, stated, "That didn't help us any. It just let them put in that O'Brien who's slippery and faster and gave us more trouble. The other guy just sits there and waits, and that's what we wanted." Michigan State finished second behind Notre Dame in the final voting for the national championship.

In 1988, Smith was enshrined in the College Football Hall of Fame. Michigan State retired his number 95 jersey on September 23, 2006, prior to the Spartans' home game against Notre Dame, amid repeated cheers of his old slogan from the student section. This game also celebrated the 40th anniversary of the "Game of the Century."

Professional

Smith was the No. 1 overall pick in the 1967 NFL draft, taken by the Baltimore Colts with a selection originally held by the expansion New Orleans Saints, which had been traded for quarterback Gary Cuozzo. Smith's Michigan State teammate, running back Clint Jones, followed him as the second pick. , Smith is the only Michigan State player to be taken first overall.

Smith spent nine seasons in the NFL as a defensive end and played in the Super Bowl twice in his first five seasons. The heavily-favored Colts lost Super Bowl III to the New York Jets and won Super Bowl V two years later following the 1970 season. It was Smith's only Super Bowl ring. However, in interviews, Smith stated that he would never wear the ring, out of a sense of disappointment that he and his teammates were unable to win Super Bowl III. 

He was injured at Tampa Stadium in the 1972 preseason when he ran into a solid steel pole the NFL was using at the time to mark yardage and missed the season. He filed a lawsuit against the Tampa Sports Authority and the NFL for $2.5 million. He contended the referees mishandled the markers, creating "an undue hazard". The court battle lasted six years before ending in a mistrial.

He was traded from the Colts to the Oakland Raiders for Raymond Chester on July 16, 1973. He finished his career with the Houston Oilers. He was selected All-Pro one year, All-Conference two years, and went to two Pro Bowls. His legacy is the inspiration behind the documentary, Through the Banks of the Red Cedar, written and directed by MSU teammate Gene Washington's daughter, Maya Washington.

Acting career
After retiring from professional football, Smith began acting in small movie and television roles in the late 1970s and early 1980s. He is perhaps best known for his role as Moses Hightower in the Police Academy movie series, a role he reprised in all but one of the Police Academy sequels. He also played as the chauffeur for Ned Beatty character, Clyde Torkle, in the movie Stroker Ace starring Burt Reynolds.

Smith starred in the short-lived television series Blue Thunder, partnering with Pro Football Hall of Fame defensive star Dick Butkus, with whom he frequently costarred in advertisements for Miller Lite beer. Among other television series Smith appeared in were Good Times, Half Nelson, The Odd Couple, Wonder Woman, Taxi, Hart to Hart, MacGyver, Married... with Children and Family Matters.

Smith was the longtime spokesman of Baltimore-area law firm Cohen, Snyder, Eisenberg & Katzenberg.

Personal life
In 1983, Smith published the autobiography entitled Kill, Bubba, Kill, in which he stated he felt it was possible Super Bowl III had been rigged to enable the Jets to win in order to ensure the AFL–NFL merger proceeded smoothly.

Smith was found dead in his Los Angeles home by his caretaker on August 3, 2011. He died from acute drug intoxication and heart disease. Phentermine, a weight-loss drug, was found in his system. His heart weighed more than twice that of an average similar male. He was 66 years old.

CTE diagnosis
On May 24, 2016, it was announced that Smith had the brain disease chronic traumatic encephalopathy (CTE), a neurodegenerative illness affecting unknown numbers of former athletes in contact sports. The findings were confirmed by researchers affiliated with the Department of Veterans Affairs, Boston University and the Concussion Legacy Foundation, and released with the permission of the executor of Smith's estate.

Smith is the 90th former NFL player found to have had CTE by the researchers at the Boston University brain bank; they have examined 94 former pro players. According to the Concussion Legacy Foundation, on a scale of 1 to 4 used by the neuropathologist who examined Smith's brain, Smith had Stage 3 CTE, with symptoms including cognitive impairment and problems with judgment and planning.

Filmography

References

External links
 
 
 

1945 births
2011 deaths
20th-century American male actors
African-American male actors
African-American players of American football
All-American college football players
American Conference Pro Bowl players
American football defensive ends
American football defensive tackles
American football players with chronic traumatic encephalopathy
American male film actors
American male television actors
Baltimore Bullets (1963–1973) draft picks
Baltimore Colts players
College Football Hall of Fame inductees
Houston Oilers players
Michigan State Spartans football players
National Football League first-overall draft picks
Oakland Raiders players
People from Orange, Texas
Players of American football from Texas
Sportspeople from Beaumont, Texas